The Butcher is a 2009 action film directed by Jesse V. Johnson and starring Eric Roberts.

Plot
Merle Hench (Eric Roberts), nicknamed "The Butcher", is a henchman for gangster Murdoch (Robert Davi) until Hench takes the fall for his boss. Having survived, Hench will earn his nickname on a mission for revenge.

Cast
 Eric Roberts as Merle "The Butcher" Hench
 Robert Davi as Murdoch
 Keith David as Larry Cobb
 Geoffrey Lewis as Naylor
 Irina Björklund as Jackie
 Michael Ironside as Teddy Carmichael
 Bokeem Woodbine as Pete "Chinatown Pete"
 Guillermo Díaz as Owen Geiger
 Paul Dillon as Doyle
 Jerry Trimble as Eddie Hellstrom 
 Charles Arthur Berg as Charlie "Loco Charlie"
 Julie Carmen as Rose
 Vernon Wells as 1970's IRA Commander
 Dominique Vandenberg as 1970's IRA Member

Production
Filming of The Butcher took place in California, particularly Los Angeles and Rosemead in September 2007. 20th Century Fox Home Entertainment released the film straight to DVD in July 2009.

References

External links
 

2009 films
Films shot in Los Angeles
American action thriller films
2009 action thriller films
2000s English-language films
Films directed by Jesse V. Johnson
2000s American films